The Marvin Gaye Collection released by Motown Records in 1990. The box set, divided into four categories, features thirty-four unreleased songs, including the sessions from 1979's The Ballads (later released in 1997 as Vulnerable).

The set is out of print, usurped by 1995's The Master (1961-1984).

Track listing

Disc One (20 Top 20s)
"Stubborn Kind of Fellow" - 2:49
"Hitch Hike" - 2:32
"Pride and Joy" - 2:28
"Can I Get a Witness" - 2:47
"You're a Wonderful One" - 2:46
"Try It Baby" - 2:59
"How Sweet It Is (To Be Loved by You)" - 2:55
"I'll Be Doggone" - 2:47
"Ain't That Peculiar" - 2:57
"I Heard It Through the Grapevine" - 3:12
"Too Busy Thinking About My Baby" - 2:53
"That's the Way Love Is" - 3:39
"What's Going On" - 3:50
"Mercy Mercy Me (The Ecology)" - 3:13
"Inner City Blues (Make Me Wanna Holler)" - 3:04
"Trouble Man" - 3:39
"Let's Get It On" (Single version) - 4:00
"I Want You" - 3:55
"Got to Give It Up" (Single version) - 4:12
"Sexual Healing" - 3:58

Disc two (The Duets)
"Once Upon a Time" - 2:28 	
"What's the Matter with You Baby" - 2:19 	
"I'm Yours, You're Mine" - 2:07 	
"All I Got" - 3:12 	
"You Can Dance" - 2:17
Tracks 1-5 performed with Mary Wells	
"Rilleh" - 2:32 	
"So Good to Be Loved by You" - 2:23 	
"Was It a Dream" - 3:12 	
"Steadies" - 2:23 	
Tracks 6-9 performed with Oma Page
"It Takes Two" - 2:56 	
"Exactly Like You" - 2:41 	
"Teach Me Tonight" - 3:15 	
"Let's Do It (Let's Fall in Love)" - 2:22 	
"It's Me" - 2:49 	
Tracks 10-14 performed with Kim Weston
"Ain't No Mountain High Enough" - 2:26 	
"Your Precious Love" - 2:59 	
"If I Could Build My Whole World Around You" - 2:20 	
"If This World Were Mine" - 2:41 	
"Ain't Nothing Like the Real Thing" - 2:15 	
"You're All I Need to Get By" - 2:39 	
Tracks 15-20 performed with Tammi Terrell
"You Are Everything" - 3:07 	
"You're a Special Part of Me" - 4:37 	
"My Mistake (Was to Love You)" - 3:02 	
"Don't Knock My Love" - 2:16
Tracks 21-24 performed with Diana Ross 	
"Pops, We Love You" - 3:51
Performed with Diana Ross, Smokey Robinson and Stevie Wonder

Disc three (Rare, Live and Unreleased)
"Let Your Conscience Be Your Guide" - 3:02 	
"Never Let You Go (Sha Lu Bop)" - 2:44 	
"It's Party Time" - 2:36 	
"The Christmas Song (Chestnuts Roasting on an Open Fire)" (Live from the Apollo) - 2:22 	
"Down and Under When You Limbo" - 2:43 	
"My Girl" - 2:42 	
"It's Not Unusual" - 2:21 	
"Sunny" - 2:57 	
"Sweeter as the Days Go By" - 2:50 	
"Sweet Thing" - 3:09 	
"I Love You Secretly (aka 'My Last Chance')" - 4:33 	
"I Want to Come Home for Christmas" - 4:41 	
"5, 10, 15, 20 Years of Love" - 2:41 	
"You're My Everything (aka 'I'd Give My Life for You)" - 3:29 	
"Come Get to This" (Live at the Alameda County Coliseum, Oakland, California) - 2:56 	
"Distant Lover" (Live at the Alameda County Coliseum, Oakland, California) - 6:15 	
"Jan" (Live at the Alameda County Coliseum, Oakland, California) - 3:10 	
"'60s Hits Medley" (Live from the London Palladium, London, England) - 8:50 			
"Star Spangled Banner" (Live from the 1983 NBA All-Star Game) - 3:13

Disc four (The Balladeer)
"I've Grown Accustomed to Her Face" - 3:28 	
"Straighten Up and Fly Right" - 2:21 	
"Too Young" - 3:45 	
"Mona Lisa" - 3:00 	
"It's Only a Paper Moon" - 2:23 	
"What Kind of Fool Am I?" - 3:39 	
"The Days of Wine and Roses" - 3:35 	
"Mack the Knife" - 2:57 	
"Hello Young Lovers" - 2:34 	
"Happy Days Are Here Again" - 2:45 	
"Why Did I Choose You" - 2:34 	
"She Needs Me" - 3:24 	
"Funny" - 2:42 	
"This Will Make You Laugh" - 2:52 	
"The Shadow of Your Smile" - 3:01 	
"I Wish I Didn't Love You So" - 2:27 	
"I Won't Cry Anymore" - 2:51

1990 greatest hits albums
Marvin Gaye compilation albums
Motown compilation albums